Cham Anjir may refer to:

Cham Anjir, Delfan
Cham Anjir, Khorramabad